East Ilsley is a village and civil parish in the Berkshire Downs in West Berkshire, north of Newbury. The village is centred immediately east of the A34 dual carriageway which passes the length of the village from north to south. It has the vast majority of its buildings in a traditional clustered centre.

History

Hildersley
The parish was anciently called Hildersley, as in a medieval inscription in the church.  West Ilsley was a hamlet in Ilsley. Ilsley has been attributed by antiquaries as a leading contender for the uncertain site of the Battle of Ashdown (Alfred the Great's victory against the Danes).  Hilde-Laege, a strong plausible root of Hildersley, means "battle place".

Sheep market
In 1620 East Ilsley was granted a charter to hold a sheep market in the village, however the market had been informally held from the reign of Henry II.  This became the second largest sheep market in the country, after Smithfield, throughout the 19th century.

Economy in the 1870s
Its real property, farms and homes, was worth £4,490 and its population in the United Kingdom Census 1871 was 746.  It had 130 houses. This capital was remarked in a contemporary description as owned by a few. The manor belonged to Capt. Woodley, and great part of the land to Col. Robert Loyd-Lindsay. The benefice remained in the default form of a rectory, rather than a vicarage, in the diocese of Oxford, worth £722. The patron was Magdalen College, Oxford. There was, by this time, a National School in the village.

Church
The parish Church of St Mary is partly Norman; has an early English style chancel and has an embattled tower; it was enlarged and repaired in 1845 and contains an old monument of one of the Hildesleys, the ancient lords of the manor. The church is a Grade I listed building.

Notable inhabitants
John Hilsey, head of a Dominican Order and bishop of Rochester turned agent of Henry VIII's dissolution of the monasteries, was born here;
Richard Wightwick, co-founder of Pembroke College, Oxford, rector.

Transport

Rail
Historically, the village was served by Compton railway station, which opened in 1882 and closed in 1962, on the Didcot, Newbury and Southampton Railway.

Buses
East Ilsley is served by buses 6 and 6A from Newbury.

Roads and footpaths
The Ridgeway long-distance footpath passes through a subway below the A34, approximately one mile north of the village.

Racehorse training
Racehorses have been trained at East Ilsley for about 200 years, as an offshoot from the economic centre of training in the United Kingdom and Ireland, ten miles west at Lambourn.

Demography
Of its 216 homes in 2011, the majority in this parish were owner-occupied; just over 10% were socially rented.

Nearest places

Notes

References

External links

East and West Ilsley - voluntary-run Communicator (forum) and News
East Ilsley History Society

Villages in Berkshire
West Berkshire District
Civil parishes in Berkshire